is a Japanese film editor from Tokyo.

Seyama is the editor of many anime series and movies from Studio Ghibli, Katsuhiro Otomo, and Satoshi Kon, including hits such as Princess Mononoke, Steamboy, and Paprika. In 1992, Seyama founded the "Seyama Editing Room," which specializes in editing anime.

Filmography 

-As Editor

Heidi, Girl of the Alps (1974) - 1 episode
Princess Sarah (1985) - TV Series
Sherlock Hound (1984-85) - 6 Episodes
Castle in the Sky (1986)
My Neighbor Totoro (1988)
Grave of the Fireflies (1988)
Akira (1988)
Venus Wars (1989)
Only Yesterday (1991)
Whisper of the Heart (1995)
Princess Mononoke (1997)
My Neighbors the Yamadas (1999)
Princess Arete (2001)
Tokyo Godfathers (2003)
Steamboy (2004)
Paprika (2006)
Tales from Earthsea (2006)

External links

Living people
Japanese film editors
1944 births
Akira (franchise)